Harrold Sincock (10 December 1907 – 2 February 1982) was an Australian cricketer. He played in two first-class matches for South Australia in 1929/30.

See also
 List of South Australian representative cricketers

References

External links
 

1907 births
1982 deaths
Australian cricketers
South Australia cricketers
Cricketers from Adelaide